The Cauca poison frog (Andinobates bombetes, synonyms Dendrobates bombetes, Ranitomeya bombetes) is a species of frog in the family Dendrobatidae.
It is endemic to Colombia.

Its natural habitats are subtropical or tropical dry forests and subtropical or tropical moist montane forests.
It is threatened by habitat loss.

When compared to other poison frogs the cauca poison frog has a limited homing ability to others who have been previously studied.

References

Amphibians of Colombia
Amphibians described in 1980
Andinobates
Taxonomy articles created by Polbot